This was a new event on the 2013 ITF Women's Circuit.

Yuliya Beygelzimer and Maryna Zanevska won the title, defeating Alona Fomina and Christina Shakovets in the final 6–3, 6–1.

Seeds

Draw

References 
 Draw

Trabzon Cup (1) - Doubles
Trabzon Cup
2013 in Turkish tennis